Ernest Astakhov (born 21 August 1998) is a professional Ukrainian football defender who plays for Jonava.

Career

Ukraine 
Born in Dnipro, Astakhov is a product of the various youth sports schools in his native city. He joined the professional ranks in 2016 when he signed with FC Nikopol in the Ukrainian Second League. He re-signed with the club for the 2017-18 season. Overall during his two-year tenure with the club, he appeared in 40 league matches. 

In 2019, he remained in the third tier by signing with FC Kremin Kremenchuk. In his debut season with Kremin, he assisted the club in securing promotion to the Ukrainian First League by winning the league title. He would appear in 18 league matches but was released from his contract following the conclusion of the season. His release was short-lived as he re-signed with the club for next season and made his debut in the second tier.

Belarus 
In July 2020, he went abroad to sign with FC Torpedo-BelAZ Zhodino in the Belarusian Premier League. Initially, he tryout with the club and was ultimately offered a contract. Throughout his tenure with Torpedo, he played in the 2021–22 UEFA Europa Conference League against F.C. Copenhagen in both matches. After two seasons in Belarus, he departed from the club on February 8, 2022.

Lithuania  
Before he officially played in Lithuania he spent the summer months in the Canadian Soccer League with FC Continentals. Following his brief stint in Canada, he signed with Lithuania's FK Jonava of the A Lyga. He made his debut for Jonava on August 13, 2022, against Kauno Žalgiris.

International career 
Astakhov was called up to represent the Ukraine national student football team in 2019.

References

External links 
Profile at the Official UAF Site (Ukr)

1998 births
Living people
Footballers from Dnipro
Ukrainian footballers
Ukrainian expatriate footballers
FC Nikopol players
FC Kremin Kremenchuk players
FC Torpedo-BelAZ Zhodino players 
FC Continentals players 
FK Jonava players
Ukrainian First League players  
Ukrainian Second League players
Canadian Soccer League (1998–present) players 
Belarusian Premier League players 
A Lyga players
Expatriate footballers in Belarus
Expatriate footballers in Lithuania
Ukrainian expatriate sportspeople in Belarus
Ukrainian expatriate sportspeople in Lithuania
Association football defenders
Ukraine student international footballers